The 2001 Nebelhorn Trophy took place between September 4 and 7, 2001 at the Bundesleistungszentrum Oberstdorf. It is an international senior-level figure skating competition organized by the Deutsche Eislauf-Union and held annually in Oberstdorf, Germany. The competition is named after the Nebelhorn, a nearby mountain.

It was one of the first international senior competitions of the season. Skaters were entered by their respective national federations, rather than receiving individual invitations as in the Grand Prix of Figure Skating, and competed in four disciplines: men's singles, ladies singles, pair skating, and ice dance. The Fritz-Geiger-Memorial Trophy was presented to the country with the highest placements across all disciplines.

Results

Men

Ladies

Pairs

Ice dance

External links
 2001 Nebelhorn Trophy

Nebelhorn Trophy
Nebelhorn Trophy, 2001
2001 in German sport